The 2018 Holiday Bowl was a college football bowl game played on December 31, 2018. It was the 41st edition of the Holiday Bowl, and one of the 2018–19 bowl games concluding the 2018 FBS football season. This was the second season in which the Holiday Bowl was held at the SDCCU Stadium. Sponsored by San Diego County Credit Union, the game was officially known as the San Diego County Credit Union Holiday Bowl.

Teams
The game featured the Northwestern Wildcats, champions of the Big Ten West Division, and the Utah Utes, champions of the Pac-12 South Division. The programs had previously met twice, with Northwestern winning in 1927 and Utah winning in 1981.

Northwestern Wildcats

Northwestern was defeated in the 2018 Big Ten Football Championship Game on December 1 by Ohio State, then received and accepted a bid to the Holiday Bowl on December 2. The Wildcats entered the bowl with an 8–5 record (8–1 in conference).

Utah Utes

Utah was defeated in the 2018 Pac-12 Football Championship Game on November 30 by Washington, then received and accepted a bid to the Holiday Bowl on December 2. The Utes entered the bowl with a 9–4 record (6–3 in conference).

Game summary

Scoring summary

Statistics

References

External links
 Box score at ESPN
 Game program

Holiday Bowl
Holiday Bowl
Northwestern Wildcats football bowl games
Utah Utes football bowl games
Holiday Bowl
Holiday Bowl